The 2017 World Judo Cadets Championships is an edition of the World Judo Cadets Championships, organised by the International Judo Federation. It was held in Santiago, Chile from 9 to 13 August 2017. The final day of competition featured the inaugural mixed team world cadets championships, won by team Russia.

Medal summary

Medal table

Men's events

Women's events

Source Results

Mixed

Source Results

References

External links
 

World Judo Cadets Championships
 U18
World Championships, U18
Judo
Judo in Chile
Judo
Judo, World Championships U18